The Argentine snake-necked turtle (Hydromedusa tectifera), also known commonly as the South American snake-necked turtle is a species of turtle in the family Chelidae. The species is known for the long neck to which its common names refer. Despite appearances, the Argentine snake-necked turtle is probably more closely related to the mata mata (Chelus fimbriatus) than to the Australian snake-necked turtles in the genus Chelodina. H. tectifera is found in northern Argentina, Uruguay, Paraguay, and southern Brazil. Not much is known about it, as it has not been extensively researched. It is a popular pet in the exotic pet trade.

Anatomy and morphology

H. tectifera can reach up to 28 centimeters (11 inches) in straight carapace length. Its carapace is strongly keeled, and it can also be distinguished by black and yellowish markings along its head and neck. Generally, the females are larger than the males which often have larger tails.

Natural history
The Argentine snake-necked turtle lives in slow-moving ponds, rivers, streams, and marshes, preferably with aquatic vegetation. In coastal areas, it will enter brackish water, and it may hibernate in colder areas of its distribution. It is carnivorous and eats snails, aquatic insects, fish, and amphibians. It attacks its prey with a combination of matamata-like vacuum suction and the stabbing neck motions of other snake-necked turtles. Courtship and mating has not been extensively observed in this species, although it is known that nesting occurs in the spring at the riverbanks.

See also

References

Further reading
Cope ED (1869). "Seventh Contribution to the Herpetology of Tropical America". Proceedings of the American Philosophical Society 11: 147-192. (Hydromedusa tectifera, new species, pp. 147-148).

External links

Hydromedusa
Turtles of South America
Reptiles of Argentina
Reptiles of Brazil
Reptiles of Uruguay
Reptiles of Paraguay
Reptiles described in 1869